Storm Aircraft, also called the StormAircraft Group, is an Italian aircraft manufacturer based in Sabaudia. The company specializes in the design and manufacture of kit aircraft and microlight aircraft, predominantly for the European market, as well as sub-contract work for manufacturers of larger aircraft.

Storm Aircraft was originally called SG Aviation srl, but changed its name for brand alignment. The company works predominantly with aluminum sheet and fibreglass construction methods for its kit aircraft.

The company was acquired by the Tunisian aircraft manufacturer Avionav on 3 November 2021.

History
Founded in 1981 by a group of French and Italian aeronautical engineers as SG Aviation, the company engaged in sub-contract work including the Aermacchi MB-339 empennage and Martin-Baker ejection seat mechanical units. The company has designed and produced cold parts for engine nacelles, including inlets, fan cowls and EBU and systems-to-engine interfaces.

The company has also sold over 1200 kit and complete aircraft to customers in 20 countries.

Aircraft

References

External links

 
Aircraft manufacturers of Italy
Homebuilt aircraft